Patrick George Magee (née McGee, 31 March 1922 – 14 August 1982) was a Northern Irish actor. He was noted for his collaborations with playwrights Samuel Beckett and Harold Pinter, sometimes called "Beckett's favorite actor," as well as creating the role of the Marquis de Sade in the original stage and screen productions of Marat/Sade. 

Known for his distinctive voice, he also appeared in numerous horror films and in two Stanley Kubrick films – A Clockwork Orange (1971) and Barry Lyndon (1975) – and three Joseph Losey films – The Criminal (1960), The Servant (1963) and Galileo (1975). He was a member of the Royal Shakespeare Company from 1964 to 1970.

Critic Antonia Quirke posthumously described him as "a presence so full of strangeness and charisma and difference and power," while scholar Conor Carville wrote that Magee was an "avant-garde bad-boy" and "very important and unjustly forgotten figure who represents an important aspect of the cultural ferment of the 1960s and 1970s in Britain."

Biography
McGee (he changed the spelling of his surname to Magee when he began performing, most likely to avoid confusion with another actor) was born into a middle-class Catholic family at 2 Edward Street, Armagh, County Armagh. The eldest of five children, he was educated at St. Patrick's Grammar School.

Stage acting 
His first stage experience in Ireland was with Anew McMaster's touring company, performing the works of Shakespeare. It was here that he first worked with Pinter. He was then brought to London by Tyrone Guthrie for a series of Irish plays. He met Beckett in 1957 and soon recorded passages from the novel, Molloy, and the short story, From an Abandoned Work, for BBC radio. Impressed by "the cracked quality of Magee's distinctly Irish voice," Beckett requested copies of the tapes and wrote Krapp's Last Tape especially for the actor. First produced at the Royal Court Theatre in London on 28 October 1958, the play starred Magee directed by Donald McWhinnie. A televised version with Magee directed by McWhinnie was later broadcast by BBC2 on 29 November 1972. Beckett's biographer Anthony Cronin wrote that "there was a sense in which, as an actor, he had been waiting for Beckett as Beckett had been waiting for him."

In 1964, he joined the Royal Shakespeare Company, after Pinter, directing his own play The Birthday Party, specifically requested him for the role of McCann, and stated he was the strongest in the cast. In 1965 he appeared in Peter Brook's production of Weiss' Marat/Sade, and when the play transferred to Broadway he won a Tony Award for Best Featured Actor in a Play. He also appeared in the 1966 RSC production of Staircase opposite Paul Scofield. In 1969, he played Inspector Hawkins in the RSC's original production of Dutch Uncle. His last play with the Company was Battle of Shrivings in 1970, at the Lyric Theatre, under the direction of Peter Hall.

In 1970, he played Daniel Webster in Scratch, a Broadway adaptation of The Devil and Daniel Webster by Archibald MacLean.

Film career 
Early film roles included Joseph Losey's The Criminal (1960) Dementia 13 (1963) and The Servant (1963), the latter an adaptation scripted by Pinter. He also appeared as Surgeon-Major Reynolds in Zulu (1964), Séance on a Wet Afternoon (1964), Anzio (1968), and in the film versions of Marat/Sade (1967; as de Sade) and The Birthday Party (1968). He is perhaps best known for his role as the victimised writer Frank Alexander, who tortures Alex DeLarge with Beethoven's music, in Stanley Kubrick's film A Clockwork Orange (1971). His other role for Kubrick was as Redmond Barry's mentor, the Chevalier de Balibari, in Barry Lyndon (1975). He reprised his role as the Marquis de Sade in the 1966 film adaptation of Marat/Sade, also directed by Peter Brook.

Magee also appeared in King Lear (1971), Young Winston (1972), The Final Programme (1973), Galileo (1975), Sir Henry at Rawlinson End (1980) and Chariots of Fire (1981), but was most often seen in horror films. These included the early Francis Ford Coppola outing Dementia 13 (1963), Roger Corman's The Masque of Red Death (1964), and the Boris Karloff vehicle Die, Monster, Die! (1965) for AIP; The Skull (1965), Tales from the Crypt (1972), Asylum (1972), and And Now the Screaming Starts! (1973) for Amicus Productions; Demons of the Mind (1972) for Hammer Film Productions; Lucio Fulci's The Black Cat (1981), and Walerian Borowczyk's Docteur Jekyll et les femmes (1981), which proved his final film role.

Personal life
Magee married Belle Sherry, also a native of County Armagh, in 1958. The couple had two children, twins Mark and Caroline (born February 1961), and remained together until Magee's death.

He was known as something of a "hellraiser." He often struggled with bouts of alcoholism and gambling that adversely affected his finances, and his professional relationships.

He was a staunch Irish republican, and an active campaigner for left-wing social and political causes. In 1976, he played an instrumental role in persuading his trade union Equity to boycott South Africa over the country's apartheid laws.

Death 
A heavy drinker, Magee died from a heart attack at his flat in Fulham, southwest London, on 14 August 1982 at the age of 60, according to obituaries in The Glasgow Herald and The New York Times.

Legacy 
Conor Carville, of the University of Reading, wrote of Magee:

"[Magee] is a very important and unjustly forgotten figure who represents an important aspect of the cultural ferment of the 1960s and 1970s in Britain. The persona he had off-stage was that of a hell raiser, and this blended into the roles he was cast in. He was at the forefront of theatrical and cinematic experiment of the time, and yet, as a BBC stalwart on both radio and TV and a West End actor, he was also ensconced in the mainstream. As well as this, his immersion in the new British horror genre meant he moved in underground circles. My research has revealed an undercurrent of desperation in his career, as he took on such roles for the income they provided. It is this multifaced character that makes Magee a lightning rod for the tensions and contradictions of his era."

On 29 July 2017, actor Stephen Rea, who appeared alongside Patrick Magee in a production of Samuel Beckett's play Endgame, unveiled a blue plaque commemorating Magee's birthplace at 2 Edward Street, Armagh.

Partial stage credits

Filmography

Film

Television

 1965 Doctor Finlay's Casebook (episode: Beware of the Dog)
 1973 The Protectors (Chase) as Garder
 1974 King Lear as King Lear for six-part Thames Television series.
 Thriller (1975) as Professor Carnaby
 The Flipside of Dominick Hide and Another Flip for Dominick (1979–82) as Caleb Line (final television appearance)

Radio
 From an Abandoned Work (radio play by Samuel Beckett) Monologue first broadcast in 1957 by the BBC.
 Hordes of the Things (radio series) 1980 as The Narrator.

References

External links

 Patrick Magee BFI

1922 births
1982 deaths
Male film actors from Northern Ireland
Male stage actors from Northern Ireland
Male television actors from Northern Ireland
Male Shakespearean actors from Northern Ireland
People from Armagh (city)
20th-century male actors from Northern Ireland
Tony Award winners
British male stage actors
British male film actors
British male television actors
Irish male stage actors
Irish male television actors
Irish male film actors
Royal Shakespeare Company members